Nadia Abu El-Haj (born 1962) is an American academic with a PhD in anthropology from Duke University. She is a professor of anthropology at Barnard College, Columbia University.

The author of Facts on the Ground: Archaeological Practice and Territorial Self-Fashioning in Israeli Society (2001) and The Genealogical Science: The Search for Jewish Origins and the Politics of Epistemology (2012), Abu El-Haj was the subject of dueling online petitions arguing whether she should be tenured during the 2006–07 academic year when she was recommended for tenure. Abu El-Haj received tenure in November 2007.

Biography

Early life and education
Abu El-Haj was born in the United States, the second daughter of a "Long Island Episcopalian" mother, and a Palestinian Muslim father. Her maternal grandfather was French and maternal grandmother, Norwegian-American, and she has characterized her religious upbringing as "church twice a year."

Abu El-Haj spent a couple of years in private schools in Tehran and Beirut, while her father was deployed there for the United Nations. She returned to the United States for her university studies,  attending Bryn Mawr College for her Bachelor of Arts degree in Political Science, and going on to receive her doctoral degree from Duke University. Between 1993 and 1995, she did post-doctoral work on a fellowship from Harvard University's Academy for International and Area Studies, focusing on the Middle East. She also received fellowships from the University of Pennsylvania Mellon Program, and the Institute for Advanced Study in Princeton, New Jersey. She speaks English, Arabic, French, Persian, and Hebrew.

Academic career
Abu El-Haj taught at the University of Chicago from 1997 until 2002, when she joined the faculty at Barnard College. She has also lectured at the New York Academy of Sciences, New York University, the University of Pennsylvania, the Institute of Advanced Study at Princeton, the University of Cambridge, the London School of Economics (LSE), and the School of Oriental and African Studies (SOAS) of the University of London.

A former Fulbright Fellow, she was a recipient of the SSRC-McArthur Grant in International Peace and Security, and grants from the Wenner-Gren Foundation for Anthropological Research and the National Endowment for the Humanities. She is also an Associate Editor of the American Ethnologist: A Journal of the American Ethnological Society and serves on the Editorial Collectives of Public Culture and Social Text.
In a 2008 interview with The New Yorker, she said, "I'm not a public intellectual. ... I don't court controversy."

Research

Facts on the Ground

In 2001, Abu El-Haj published Facts on the Ground: Archaeological Practice and Territorial Self-Fashioning in Israeli Society. In it, she uses anthropological methods to explore the relationship between the development of scientific knowledge and the construction of the social imaginations and political orders, using the discipline of Israeli archaeology as the subject of her study. Arguing that the facts generated by archaeological practice fashion "cultural understandings, political possibilities and 'common-sense' assumptions", she posits that, in the case of Israel, the practice works to serve the "formation and enactment of its colonial-national historical imagination and ... the substantiation of its territorial claims".

Facts on the Ground has been reviewed in both scholarly and popular publications. The book was awarded the Middle East Studies Association of North America 2002 Albert Hourani Book Award which it shared with Gershon Shafir and Yoav Peled's Being Israeli: the Dynamics of Multiple Citizenship.

Other scholarship
Abu El-Haj's more recent scholarship explores the field of genetic anthropology through the analysis of projects aimed at reconstructing the origins and migrations of specific populations. Analysis is also directed toward the role of for-profit corporations offering genetic ancestry testing. How race, diaspora, and kinship intersect, and how genetic origins emerge as a shared concern among those seeking redress or recognition, are predominant themes in the work.

Reviewing El-Haj's 2012 book, The Genealogical Science: The Search for Jewish Origins and the Politics of Epistemology,  geneticist Richard Lewontin, writing in The New York Review of Books, described her as a "genetic determinist" not in the "usual sense" but because she writes that "fundamental aspects of who one is are determined by one's past" and that "who we really are collectively and individually is given by and legible in biological data." He proposes that a term such as "biological determinism" might be coined to describe her attitude despite her assertion that although the choice to act or not act on the available information about our ancestry, which she describes as telling us who we "really are" is a matter of free choice.

Tenure controversy
Abu El-Haj joined the Anthropology Department at Barnard College in the fall of 2002. Because of Barnard College's affiliation with Columbia University, professors recommended for tenure at Barnard are subject to approval by Columbia. Abu El-Haj was recommended for tenure by the faculty at Barnard in the 2006–07 academic year, and by Columbia in the 2007–08 academic year.

Dueling petitions
On August 7, 2007, an online petition against the professor was started by Paula Stern, a 1982 Barnard alumna who lives in the Israeli settlement of Ma'aleh Adumim. In response to Stern's petition, in late August a petition supporting Abu El-Haj was initiated by Paul Manning, a linguist in the anthropology department at Trent University in Peterborough, Canada.

By the time Barnard announced that it had granted Abu El-Haj tenure, in November 2007, 2,592 people had signed the anti-tenure petition and 2,057 had signed the pro-tenure petition. The number of signatures on either side had no relevance to the tenure proceedings.

Academic debate of Abu El-Haj's credentials
In August 2007, The Chronicle of Higher Education reported on support for Abu El-Haj among scholars of anthropology and of Middle East studies. Lisa Wedeen, Chair of the Political Science department at the University of Chicago, said that Facts on the Ground showed that Abu El-Haj was more interested in the philosophy of science than in political argument.

The Chronicle of Higher Education also wrote that many of Abu El-Haj's supporters said that peer review, and not public pressure, is the appropriate measure of a scholar's work, noting that she has been the recipient of many awards, grants, and academic appointments. An article in The New York Times in September 2007 reported that many of Abu El-Haj's supporters, particularly those in the field of anthropology, praised her book as "solid, even brilliant, and part of an innovative trend". For example, Michael Dietler, a professor of anthropology at the University of Chicago, described Abu El-Haj as a top-quality scholar. Dietler also said Abu El-Haj was being opposed because she is of Palestinian descent.

Alan F. Segal, a professor of religion and Jewish studies at Barnard, questioned the quality of her research. Saying that Abu El-Haj had suggested that "ancient Israelites had not inhabited the land where Israel now stands", Segal said that she either ignored or misunderstood the evidence to the contrary. In a critique of Facts on the Ground published in the Columbia Daily Spectator, Segal wrote that he opposed Abu El-Haj for professional, and not political, reasons. Segal later told The Forward that Abu El-Haj hates Israelis.

William G. Dever, retired professor of Near East archaeology at the University of Arizona, told The New York Sun that Abu El-Haj should be denied tenure because her scholarship is "faulty, misleading and dangerous", and not because she is a Palestinian or a leftist.

Segal and Dever spoke at lectures sponsored by Scholars for Peace in the Middle East and LionPAC (a pro-Israel advocacy group at Columbia) aimed at rebutting El-Haj. In his lecture, Dever disputed the notion that archaeology has inherent biases. However, archaeological theory challenges this notion. In responding to the controversy surrounding Abu El-Haj's work, Barnard President Judith Shapiro said that showing how archaeological research can be used for political and ideological purposes is a legitimate cultural anthropological enterprise.

Tenure decision
On November 2, 2007, Barnard announced that Abu El-Haj had been granted tenure. Subsequent to the tenure decision, Barnard president Shapiro praised Abu El-Haj to an interviewer from the New Yorker.

Published works
 The Genealogical Science: The Search for Jewish Origins and the Politics of Epistemology, University of Chicago Press (2012)
 "The Genetic Reinscription of Race" in Annual Review of Anthropology (2007).
 "Rethinking Genetic Genealogy: A Response to Stephan Palmi" in American Ethnologist (2007), 34:2:223–227.Contents and Abstracts from AE Vol. 34, No. 2 | AESonline.org
 "Edward Said and the Political Present" in American Ethnologist (2005), 32:4:538–555.
 "Reflections on Archaeology and Israeli Settler-Nationhood" in Radical History Review (Spring 2003), 86:149–163. 
 "Producing (Arti)Facts: Archaeology and Power during the British Mandate of Palestine" in Israel Studies Summer (2002), 7:2:33–61.
 Facts on the Ground: Archaeological Practice and Territorial Self-Fashioning in Israeli Society (2001), University of Chicago Press.
 "Translating Truths: Nationalism, Archaeological Practice and the Remaking of Past and Present in Contemporary Jerusalem" in American Ethnologist (1998), 25:2:166–188.

References

External links
 Barnard faculty profile
Columbia faculty profile
 Who Got to Decide on Nadia Abu El-Haj's Tenure? By Dan Rabinowitz and Ronen Shamir, American Association of University Professors

1962 births
Living people
American anthropologists
American women anthropologists
American archaeologists
Bryn Mawr College alumni
Barnard College faculty
Duke University alumni
American people of Palestinian descent
Academics of the University of Cambridge
Academics of the London School of Economics
Academics of SOAS University of London
University of Chicago faculty
New York University faculty
Institute for Advanced Study visiting scholars
University of Pennsylvania faculty
American women academics
American expatriates in Iran
American expatriates in Lebanon
21st-century American women
Harvard Fellows
Fulbright alumni